Corkin Cherubini (born April 25, 1944) is an American educator, musician, and writer.  He is best known for efforts to rectify civil rights abuses in the small southern school district where he was school superintendent.  His efforts gained national recognition, spotlighting a problem in school districts, nationwide.  He received the John F. Kennedy Profile in Courage Award in 1996.

Early life
Corkin Cherubini's early life was spent in Portland, Oregon, and later in Worcester, MA.  Most of junior high and high school was in southern New Jersey.  He graduated from Vineland High School in 1962.

Cherubini went to Troy University in the fall of 1962 and graduated with concentrations in English Literature, history, and aesthetics in the arts in 1967.  He completed work for a master's degree in Audiovisual Education at the University of Virginia and his doctorate in Educational Leadership from Auburn University.  In 1986, he received a National Endowment for the Humanities  grant to study William Shakespeare's Hamlet at Harvard University.

Career

In 1992, Cherubini was elected school superintendent of the Calhoun County, Georgia, School District where he had taught for twenty-two years.

As school superintendent, Cherubini was in a position to investigate the "racial tracking" of students from kindergarten through high school.  He discovered that no reliable criteria were used for kindergarten placement, and that the composition of the two lower learning levels in kindergarten remained virtually unchanged throughout elementary and junior high school.  This practice automatically insured that children in the lower tracks, primarily children of color, were destined for non-academic tracks in high school.

Cherubini's initial plan was to balance the composition of classes, beginning in kindergarten.  Each year, an additional grade level would feature a more balanced class composition.  However, public outcry necessitated more stringent measures, and Cherubini turned to the Department of Education and the Office of Civil Rights for help.

In late 1994, the Office of Civil Rights and Miami Equity Associates, a branch of the Southeastern Desegregation Center financed by the federal government, concluded that neither test scores, grades, nor teacher evaluation were used for student placement—a violation of the 1964 Civil Rights Act.  As a result, the four tier tracking model in Cherubini's system was abandoned.  Funding from the United States Department of Education enabled the system to educate teachers so they might effectively teach a classroom of children with many levels of learning ability.
Cherubini's fight reflected a national debate over tracking and the difficulties of changing that culture.  Cherubini's determination to see that all students in his school system had equal educational opportunity spotlighted a pervasive problem, not just in the South, but throughout America. Cherubini's efforts spawned nationwide change.

Awards

In 1996, Cherubini received the John F. Kennedy Profile in Courage Award.  He was the seventh awardee and the first local politician to receive the award. He was commended for his courage and leadership in working for quality education for children.

Asked if he would pursue the same course of action or a safer course, Cherubini replied, "There is not one action I would change.  As the chief advocate for children in my county, I carefully made each decision for the well-being and betterment of these children, and I would have to take a similar course though the consequences be many times as formidable."

Cherubini retired in 1997.  Since then, he has written and published two books, Gang Stalking:  The Threat to Humanity (2014)  and Suzanne:  Targeted for Death (2015).  He has also written, performed, and produced two political protest musical CD's, Indigo After Rain (2008) and in 2009, Back to Boheme.

References 

Additional Reading
 Pierce, David.  "He'll Have a Steady Literary Diet This Summer," The Albany Herald, Sunday, May 25, 1986, 12A. (Contact Newsroom Library at 229-888-9371.)
 Douglas, Todd.  "Rights Probe Underway in Calhoun: Do Schools Violate the Law?" The Albany Herald, Tuesday, November 1, 1994, 12A.  (Contact Newsroom Library at 229-888-9371.)
 Partridge, Wayne.  "Hate Flier Causes Stir in Calhoun," The Albany Herald, November 4, 1994, 1A, 4A.  (Contact Newsroom Library at 229-888-9371.)
 Partridge, Wayne.  "Calhoun Still Tense but Quiet," The Albany Herald, Monday, November 7, 1994.  (Contact Newsroom Library at 229-888-9371.) 
 Lasenby, David.  "Embattled Calhoun Schools Chief Rehired," The Albany Herald, Wednesday, May 15, 1996.  (Contact Newsroom Library at 229-888-9371.)
 "Profiles in Courage:  Following His Own Convictions," The Albany Herald, Sunday, May 26, 1996, G1.  (Contact Newsroom Library at 229-888-9371.)
 "Kennedys Honor Cherubini for Courage," The Albany Herald, Wednesday, May 29, 1996, 1A, 4A.  (Contact Newroom Library at 229-888-9371.)
 White, Betsy.  "Desegregation Plan Stirs Uncertainty," The Atlanta Constitution, June 2, 1995. (Available at Newsbank.com.)
 "Georgian Getting 'Courage' Award from Kennedys," The Atlanta Constitution, May 15, 1996, B2.
 White, Betsy.  "A County's Conscience:  School Superintendent Honored, Attacked for Fighting for Values He Believes In," The Atlanta Constitution, Sunday, May 26, 1996, G2. (Available at Newsbank.com)
 "World Class Superintendent," The Atlanta Constitution, Wednesday, May 29, 1996, C7.
 Hart, Jordana.  "Educators Hear of a Racism Battle That's Being Won," The Boston Globe, August 13, 1995, at www.highbeam.com/doc/1P2-8339750.html
 O'Brien, Ellen.  "Georgia Educator Receives 'Profile in Courage' Award," The Boston Globe, May 15, 1996, at www.highbeam.com/doc/1P2-8373892.html
 Slattery, Ryan. "JFK Courage Award Goes to Educator Who Spotted Racism," The Boston Globe, Wednesday, May 29, 1996, 22.
 Dougherty, Robin.  "Caroline Kennedy Honoring Those Who Take a Stand," The Boston Globe, May 12, 2002, at www.highbeam.com/doc/1P2-7716387.html
 Kendall, Clinton.  "A Profile in Courage," The Dothan Eagle, June 7, 1996, 1A, 12A.
 Editorial:  "Courage:  Former Dothan Resident Captures Kennedy Profiles in Courage Award," The Dothan Eagle, Wednesday, June 12, 1996, 4A.
 Michel, Nancy.  "Cherubini Studies Hamlet at Harvard on Summer Grant," The Dothan Progress, September 3, 1986, 1A, 12A.
 "Cherubini Receives JFK Profile in Courage Award," GAE Update, September/October, 1996, 2B.
 Cherubini, Corkin.  Gang Stalking:  The Threat to Humanity. United States of America:  Cherubini,  2013.  
 Cherubini, Corkin.  Suzanne:  Targeted for Death.  United States of America:  Cherubini, 2014.  
 "Good Morning America," with Joan Lunden.
 "Education Department Orders Georgia School District to End Racial Tracking. (Calhoun County School District), Jet Magazine, July 3, 1995, at www.highbeam.com/doc/1G1-17160270.html.
 Law, Susan.  "One Man's Drive to Keep the Arts Alive," Journeys, Vol 4, No. 2, p. 4.
 Kirchner, Joan.  (AP) "Ga. School Chief Blows Whistle on Racial Tracking," The Knoxville News Sentinel, Tuesday, June 13, 1995.
 "School Leader Who Fought System Receives Award Inspired by JFK," Marietta Daily Journal, Wednesday, May 29, 1996.
 Silva, Mark.  "A Superintendent Fights His System's Segregated Schools," The Miami Herald, Tuesday, December 6, 1994, 1A, 16A.
 Kirchner, Joan. (AP) " 'Slow Learner' Classes Are Used to Isolate Blacks:  Cruel Practice in Georgia," The San Francisco Chronicle, Wednesday, June 14, 1995. Available on the database (SFChronicle.com/SFGate.com) 
 "Blowing the Whistle:  A Superintendent Fights Racial Discrimination in His Own Schools," The School Administrator, June, 1995, 6-9. (PDF version available at aasa.org.)
 "Sixty Minutes" with Lesley Stahl.  Videorecording, November 5, 1995. CBS News:  CBS Broadcast International. Worldcat # OCLC 34033717..  (Studies a Georgia school system where whites are mostly in upper level classes.  See what happens when integration is really implemented in the schools.)
 Silva, Mark.  "Georgia School Chief Fighting His Own System," The Tallahassee Democrat, Monday, December 12, 1994, 1A, 10A.

1944 births
Living people